South Korea-based boy group Astro have released three studio albums, ten extended plays, two single albums, and 14 singles.

Studio albums

Extended plays

Single albums

Singles

Promotional singles

Collaborations

Soundtracks

Videography

Notes

References

K-pop music group discographies
Discographies of South Korean artists